was a stable of sumo wrestlers, part of the Tatsunami ichimon or group of stables. It was set up in January 1995 by the former komusubi Kurosegawa, who branched out from the now defunct Isegahama stable and took with him the remaining members of the Onaruto stable which closed at the end of 1994. In 2000 it absorbed Kise stable, and in 2007 its parent Isegahama stable. As of 2009, it had seven wrestlers. In that year the stable also produced its first sekitori, the Mongolian Tokusegawa. It was also the home of the chief yobidashi or usher. The stable closed after the January 2011 tournament, with its personnel moving to Asahiyama stable, except the yobidashi Kokichi who moved to Tomozuna stable,  and gyoji Kiichiro Shikimori and tokoyama Tokosaku who moved to Oitekaze stable.

Owner
1995-2011: 20th Kiriyama (former komusubi Kurosegawa)

Notable wrestlers

Tokusegawa (maegashira)

Coach
Urakaze (former maegashira Teruzakura)

Referee
Kiichiro Shikimori (jūryō referee)

Ushers
Hideo (chief usher)
Koji (makuuchi usher)

See also
List of sumo stables

External links
Kiriyama stable at the Japan Sumo Association

Defunct sumo stables